Set List may refer to:

 Set List (The Frames album), 2002
 Set List (Duane Steele album), 2004
 Set List: Greatest Songs 2006–2007, an album by AKB48

See also
 Set list